Balaesang is a district of Donggala Regency, Central Sulawesi, Indonesia. The district capital is Tambu.

References 
 

Districts of Central Sulawesi